Danylo Halytsky Lviv National Medical University, — formerly known as the Lviv State Medical Institute, earlier the Faculty of Medicine of the John Casimir University and, before that, Faculty of Medicine of the Francis I University — is one of the oldest and biggest medical universities in Ukraine. LNMU begins from the Medical Faculty of Lviv University, which was opened on November 16, 1784, according to the privilege of the Austrian emperor Josef II. The medical school is named after King Daniel of Galicia, the historical founder of the city in 1256 AD. In 2009 University celebrated its 225 anniversary.

History

The history of Lviv Medical University goes back to 1661, when on 20 January the Jesuit Collegium in Lviv by the privilege of Polish King John II Casimir acquired the status of academy. It consisted of four departments and was awarded the title of the university. However, until the break-up of the university in 1773, the full-blown medical department was not established.

On 16 November 1784, according to the privilege of the Austrian emperor Joseph II, signed on 21 October 1784, Lviv University was revived with four faculties: theology, philosophy, law and medicine. Since then Danylo Halytsky Lviv National Medical University started counting its age.

Until 1918 
On January 20, 1661, King John II Casimir Vasa granted the privilege transforming the Jesuit College into an Academy with four faculties. There was no medical faculty at that time and this condition lasted until the closing of the university by the Austrian authorities in 1773. Emperor Joseph II, Holy Roman Emperor by a privilege of October 21, 1784 agreed to resume the university's activity, which took place November 16, 1784. The faculties of law, theology, philosophy and medicine, the existence of a medical college in Lviv has been dated since. In 1891, the Austro-Hungarian government decided to establish an independent medical faculty thanks to the intercession of the governor of Galicia (Eastern Europe), Count Kasimir Felix Badeni a medical faculty was established. In the same year, the city authorities and governorship allocated the university the area at ul. Piekarska 52 for the construction of a new faculty. The author of the project was Józef Braunseis, under whose leadership the main building of descriptive anatomy and physiology, forensic medicine, pathology, as well as chemistry and pharmacology was created in four years. By 1898, new facilities were erected to house the departments of obstetrics and gynecology, internal medicine, dermatology and venereology, and otolaryngology. In March 1900, the first sixteen graduates with the title of doctor, fourteen Poles and two Ukrainians graduated from the university. At the beginning of the 20th century many lecturers were recruited from universities with longer traditions and reputation, i.e. the Jagiellonian University, Viennaand in Heidelberg.

Second Polish Republic 
After the beginning of the 1918 academic year, education was discontinued, staff and students fought to Battle of Lemberg (1918). The next academic year was interrupted due to the Polish–Soviet War.

The university's activity was activated on March 15, 1920, within two years the Faculty of Medicine encompassed twenty-one departments, and nineteen professors were among the academic staff. In 1929 the university structure was reorganized, the Pharmaceutical Department was established at that time. Before the outbreak of World War II, the Faculty of Medicine consisted of twenty-four departments and clinics, and thirteen full professors, five associate professors and thirty-three associate professors worked among the scientific staff.

World-renowned scholars lectured at the medical faculty, including Henryk Kadyi, Wladyslaw Szymonowicz, John Prussia, Adolf Beck (physiologist), Antoni Mars, Ludwik Rydygier, Antoni Cieszyński, Roman Rencki, Jakub Karol Parnas, Rudolf Weigl, Antoni Władysław Gluziński, Stanisław Budzyński, Edmund Biernacki, Leon Popielski, Włodzimierz Sieradzki, Hilary Schramm, Emanuel Machek, Antoni Jurasz, Henryk Halban, Zdzisław Steusing, Napoleon Gąsiorowski, Witold Ziembicki, Jan Grek, Tadeusz Ostrowski, Adam Gruca, Jan Lenartowicz, Adam Bednarski, Kazimierz Bocheński, Franciszek Groër, Eugeniusz Artwiński, Teofil Zalewski, Józef Antoni Markowski, Bolesław Jałowy, Mieczysław Wierzuchowski, Włodzimierz Koskowski, Marian Franke, Witold Nowicki (lekarz).

In the 1938/1939 academic year various Departments in the Medical School were:

 Internal diseases;
 Surgery;
 Orthopedics;
 Dermatology;
 Ophthalmology;
 Obstetrics;
 Gynecology;
 Pediatrics;
 Nervous diseases;
 Psychiatry;
 Otolaryngology;
 Dentistry;
 Histology;
 Embryology;
 Physiology;
 Pharmacology;
 Pathology;
 Anatomy;
 Forensic medicine;
 Hygiene;
 Medical microbiology;
 History of medicine;
 General biology;
 Medical chemistry.

Secret Ukrainian University 
After the end of the Polish-Bolshevik war by the decision of the Ministry of Religious Affairs and Public Education (Poland), the University of Lviv became a university with only Polish as the language of instruction, professors and lecturers of Ukrainian origin were removed from the university. This caused a protest and the establishment of underground Ukrainian higher education, under which a secret Ukrainian Technical College and the Ukrainian University were established, in which the medical faculty operated in the years 1921–1925. There were ten departments where one hundred and eighty-five students studied. The group of lecturers included, among others Marian Panchyshyn, Iwan Kuroweć, Maksym Muzyka, Stefan Baley, and Ołeksandr Barwinski. Due to the lack of facilities and the possibility of conducting laboratory and clinical exercises after completing the third year, students continued to study abroad.

World War II 
After entering the city of the Red Army in autumn 1939, the Soviet authorities reorganized higher education to adapt it to the model in force in the USSR. The Faculty of Medicine was separated from the structures of the University of Lviv and became an independent university called the State Medical Institute. Oleksandr Makarczenko became the rector, the university ran two faculties - health care and pharmaceutical. In the same year, a medical science library was founded. After the arrival of German troops in Lviv at the end of June 1941, the extermination of the Polish intelligentsia began, at the beginning of July the Massacre of Lwów professors took place in the Wuleckie Hillsin the southern part of the city. Tadeusz Ostrowski, Władysław Dobrzaniecki, Stanisław Progulski, Jan Grek, Roman Rencki, Włodzimierz Sieradzki, Adam Sołowij, Stanisław Mączewski, Witold Nowicki, Antoni Cieszyński and Jerzy Grzędzielski were among the group shot. Bolesław Jałowy, Andrij Łastowećkyj and Adolf Beck also died during the Nazi occupation.. On May 20, 1942, the Nazis organized vocational medical courses at the premises of the Medical Institute bearing the official name of the State Vocational Medical and Nature Courses (Staatliche Medizinisch-Naturwissenschaftliche Fachkurse) in Lviv, their scope corresponded to the German program of higher medical education. They were called medical and preventive vocational courses, Marian Panczyszyn and Roman Osinczuk were involved in their organization.

Ukrainian Soviet Socialist Republic 
After re-entering the city of Russians, the activity of the State Medical Institute was restored. In 1961 a department for training foreigners was established, the number of which increased steadily, yet the language of instruction was Russian.

Beginning from 1961 University provides education for foreign citizens. During 50 years over 2,5 thousand doctors and pharmacists – foreigners have got education here and have been working successfully as doctors and pharmacists in many countries of the world. Education is provided in Ukrainian, Russian Language, and since 1997 the teaching of foreign students in English has been launched and is rapidly developing. Now 70% of University foreign students study in English Medium Program.

Academics
22 scientific schools actively function and develop in University: of obstetrics and gynecology, biochemical, hygienic, of infectious diseases, of history of medicine and pharmacy, microbiological, morphological, of neurology and neurosurgery, of oncology, of otorhynolaryngology, ophthalmological, of pathological anatomy and pathological physiology, pediatric, psychiatric, of dentistry, of internal diseases, pharmacological, physiological, of phtisiatry, of chemistry and pharmacy, of surgery. University library contains more than 530,000 volumes of textbooks, manuals and other relevant medical literature. Library has modern computer equipment.

Ranking and reputations
Every Year Danylo Halytsky Lviv National Medical University Ranks Among Top 3 Medical Institutes in the Country.

Webometrics (2019) gave it a Country Rank of 12 out of 320 Universities in Ukraine, a World Rank of 3551 out of 27219 Universities in the World, a Continental (Europe) Rank of 1107 out of 5833 Universities in Europe.

Scimago Institutions Ranking (2019) which Rank very Few Prime Institutes in the World Gave it an Overall Rank of 767 out of 6459 Top Rank Institutions in the World, a Country Rank of 8 out of only 32 Prime Institutes in Whole of the Ukraine, The Institute got a Research Rank of 422 out of 6459, an Innovation Rank of 505 out of 6459 and a Societal Rank of 242 out of 6459.

4icu (2019) gave it a Country Rank of 77 out of 171 Universities in Ukraine and a World Rank of 7246 out of 13600 Universities in the World.

Taking into account state and international recognition of university activity, great contributions to the development of national education and science, Danylo Halytsky Lviv State Medical University was conferred the status of National Medical University on 21 August 2003 by Presidential Decree No. 872.

Honour of the Medical University 
In 2009, when the medical university celebrated its 225th anniversary since its foundation, the Government of Ukraine launched a ₴5 Coin with the seal, name and motto of the National Medical University, in honour and respect of the institution.

Faculty and staff

At 78 University departments, at the Institute of Clinical Pathology, in the Central Research Laboratory (CRL) and Laboratory of industrial toxicology are working 1211 scientists: 134 Doctor of Sciences and more than 620 PhD degree holders, including 113 full professors, 369 associate professors, 50 senior tutors, 662 assistant professors, 17 researchers. Among them there are 23 Members, 7 Corresponding Members of Academy of Sciences, 12 Honored Workers of Science and Technology, 
7 Honored Workers of Education, 19 Honored Doctors, 1 Honored Worker of Physical Culture and Sport, 
8 Laureates of the State Prize of Ukraine in Science and Technology.

Today Danylo Halytsky Lviv National Medical University combines 6 faculties, medical college, 78 departments (including 48 clinical departments), 14 academic buildings, 41 affiliated hospitals, University dental medical center for more than 2000 attendances during shift, teaching drugstore, botanical garden, CRL and Laboratory of industrial toxicology, Institute of clinical pathology, research center for investigation of anticancer drugs, scientific library, 8 student hostels, sanatorium, student cafes and canteens, sports and health recovery camp "Medyk".
There are 40 amateur groups, clubs, workshops in University. Among them three amateur groups have the high degree of National. These National amateur groups are: folk dance ensemble "Horytsvit" (Adonis), folk choir "Muses of Hippocrates", folk ensemble "Medicus".
There are 23 sport-public and recreation and sports clubs in the University.

Student life
About 2746 students are studying at 38 departments here. 484 foreigners are studying at the faculty as well. The teaching process is carried out by 500 teachers – academicians, professors, assistant professors, senior teachers and assistants. The annual university number of students is more than 19,100 persons, which includes 5426 undergraduate students (including more than 1000 foreign students), 62 students of Preparatory Course, more than 1500 internship doctors, 50 students of Master's program, 70 students of PhD program, 70 Postgraduate doctors (Clinichna Ordynatura), around 11,000 students of Faculty of Postgraduate training, 312 students of Medical College. Students of all Faculties study according to the credit-module system. University library contains more than 530,000 volumes of textbooks, manuals and other relevant medical literature. Library has modern computer equipment
In 2011 the first graduation of students, who studied according to the demands of "Bologna" process, took place.

Contemporary 
After Ukraine's independence, the university operated on an unchanged basis until 1996, when, by Resolution No. 1262 of the Council of Ministers of Ukraine, the State Medical Institute received the status of a university with a four-level accreditation level, at the same time changing its name to "Medical University of Lviv". A year later, English was introduced at the faculty for foreigners as the language of instruction. On October 21, 1998, the university was named after Danylo Halytsky. By decree of the President of Ukraine No. 872/2003 of August 21, 2003, the university received its current name - Lviv National Medical University Danylo Halytsky.

University research facilities 

The building complex of the Lviv National Medical University Daniel Halickiego occupies the area at ul. Piekarska 52, which is surrounded by a park. The buildings were built in 1891-1898 according to the design of Józef Braunseis for the medical faculty of the University of Lviv. In front of the entrance to the main building there is a square with a fountain, and inside there are plaques commemorating Jakub Parnas and Marceli Nencki. The Museum of Human Diseases is located in the neighboring building. The university also includes an old orphanage for orphans. St. Józefa at ul. Piekarska 69, in the times of the Second Polish Republic, it housed an Infectious Hospital, and now, apart from the scientific part, there is the Anatomical Museum. This building also surrounds a park with an area of 5.4 ha, in its part there is a botanical garden (1.5 ha).

Botanical garden 

Botanical garden of the Lviv National Medical University Daniel Halickiego - a botanical garden in Lviv, at ul. Piekarska 52 and 73, in the Łyczaków district, in the Lychakiv region. The public garden is available upon prior notification.

History of the botanical garden 
The garden was created on the initiative and under the direction of Professor Tadeusz Wilczyński, who in 1929-1930 created a garden of medicinal herbs in the area of the Faculty of Medicine of the University of Lviv. The founder's involvement was so great that from 1931 to 1964 he lived near the garden, cared and constantly improved and supplemented with new species. In addition to the herb collection, he created an arboretum in the neighboring area, in 1964 the entire area was declared a natural monument and is covered by environmental regulations.

Educational function of the botanical garden 

The botanical garden covers an area of 1.5 Hectares, which is located on both sides of Piekarska Street. The main part is located on the odd side of the street (No. 73), the smaller one surrounds the older campus (No. 52). About 900 kinds of plants grow in it, 220 species belonging to 70 families.

In the garden, students of the pharmaceutical faculty conduct practical classes, become familiar with environmental protection and conduct research on the natural conditions of herb growth, including places of occurrence, their vegetation, collections and methods of obtaining substances used in medicine. In addition, there is a collection of trees, shrubs, herbaceous plants and a conservatory in which exotic and tropical plants grow.

The garden includes outbuildings, a greenhouse, an educational building with a laboratory, an area including planting of medicinal herbs native to and occurring in a similar geographical zone, and an area with a collection of trees and shrubs with medicinal properties.

Notable alumni
 Stanisław Lem, was a Polish writer of science fiction, philosophy, and satire, and a trained physician
 Ludwik Fleck, was a Polish and Israeli physician and biologist who did important work in epidemic typhus in Lviv, Poland, with Rudolf Weigl
 Antoni Cieszyński, was a Polish Physician, Dentist and Surgeon. Antoni was a professor and head of the Institute of Stomatology at Lviv University
 Ludwik Rydygier, was a German-Polish surgeon and professor of Surgery Faculty and Clinic at Lviv University in 1897. He was at his time one of the most distinguished Polish and worldwide known surgeons. Some of his ideas, which include gastric surgeries, surgery of rectal cancer, amputations, plastic, orthopedic and cardiothoracic surgery and urology are successfully used to date.
 Rudolf Weigl, was a Polish biologist and inventor of the first effective vaccine against epidemic typhus. He founded the Weigl Institute in Lviv, where he conducted vaccine research.
 Jakub Karol Parnas, was a prominent Jewish-Polish–Soviet biochemist who contributed to the discovery of the Embden–Meyerhof–Parnas pathway also known as Glycolysis, together with Otto Fritz Meyerhof and Gustav Georg Embden.
 Władysław Dobrzaniecki, was a Polish Physician and Surgeon. Władysław was since 1936 head of the Saint Zofia Children Hospital in Lwów, and since 1938 titular professor of surgery at the Lviv University. He was a precursor of plastic surgery in Poland.
 Belsazar de la Motte Hacquet, was a Carniolan physician of French descent in the Enlightenment Era in 1777. He was a war surgeon, a surgeon in the mining town of Idrija, and a professor of anatomy and surgery in Laibach (now Ljubljana).
 Jan Zaorski, was a Polish Surgeon, a student of Ludwik Rydygier and Zygmunt Radliński. In 1931, Zaorski became a director of the Elisabethan Hospital in Warsaw. In 1945, he became professor of Warsaw University.
 Henryk Hilarowicz, was a Polish surgeon, and a professor at the Jan Kazimierz University in Lwów.
 Oleh Tyahnybok, is a Ukrainian, Urologist, Politician who is a former member of the Verkhovna Rada and the leader of the nationalist far-right Svoboda political party.
 Oleh Bereziuk, is a Ukrainian politician, Member of the Parliament of Ukraine of 8th convocation, Chair of the Parliamentary faction Samopomich Union, Member of the Ukrainian Association of Psychotherapists.
 Andriy Shkil,  is a Ukrainian Politician and a Pharmacist.
 Stepan Khmara, Physician and Soviet-Ukrainian politician.
 Ihor Shurma, is a Ukrainian politician and statesman. People's Deputy of Ukraine of the IV, VIII convocations. In 1982 he graduated from Danylo Halytsky Lviv National Medical University, the first years after graduation he worked as a doctor of food hygiene of the district Sanitary and Epidemiologic Station, then was a senior administrator of Farmachemistry Department at Lviv State Medical Institute.
 Andriy Chornovil, was a self-nominated candidate in the 2004 Ukrainian presidential election. In the election he collected over 36,000 votes, placing 11th place. Since June 2004 he has been an Assistant Professor of Infection Illnesses at the National Medical University of Lviv. From 2002 to 2003, he was a leading expert at the board of health care of the Lviv Regional State Administration, and a senior inspector of Western regional customs.
 Olena Antoniv, was a Famous Ukrainian Surgeon and Physician and the wife of Viacheslav Chornovil and mother of Taras Chornovil.
 Oleksandr Filts, Notable Physician.
 Yaroslav Mikhailovich Andrushkov, Physician and Soviet-Ukrainian politician.
 Pavlo Ivanovych Vitsyak, Physician.
 Anil Jasinghe, Director-General of Health Services of Sri Lanka, Vice-Chairman of World Health Organization.
 Elena Teplitskaya, doctor, psychologist and academic.

See also
Lviv University
Massacre of Lwów professors
Lviv
Scientific Library of Danylo Halytsky Lviv National Medical University
Botanical Garden of  Danylo Halytsky Lviv National Medical University

References

External links
 

 
Medical schools in Ukraine
Universities and colleges in Lviv
National universities in Ukraine